Multivía is a contactless card designed for paying the travel fares in the mass transport system Transantiago, in Santiago, the capital of Chile. Tarjeta Bip! or Bip! Card is a plastic card equipped with a chip, that automatically discounts the cost of a travel when passing the card near a contactless card reader.

Overview
Users can buy a new card for $1100 pesos (about 2 US dollars) and add money to the card in the ticket boxes located in the subways stations, bip! points, bip! centers, and inside a lot of shops in Santiago. It is the only way to pay to ride the Transantiago Greater Santiago buses, but is an option for the Metro system. As of December 2010, the adult fares were 500 pesos for the bus, and 580 pesos for the metro.

No personal data register is needed (unlike the cards used in London or other cities) with the exception of the personalized Bip! Cards, and other discount-fare Bip! Card for students and senior citizens (these cards feature a picture of the holder and the name printed on it). 

Currently, the system operates fully functional in the whole Public Transport system of Santiago. Bip! Card is similar to other pre-paid cards and pay-as-you-go systems (like the Oyster card in London's Underground, the MetroCard in New York, and the Octopus card in Hong Kong). If you use the card in any bus, or in the Metro, you will get 4 free trips inside the next 2 hours after you pay the first time.

References

Fare collection systems
Transport in Santiago
Contactless smart cards